Rear Admiral Simon Phillip Asquith,  (born 7 March 1972) is a senior Royal Navy officer who has served as Director of Submarines since April 2022.

Early life
Asquith was educated at the University of Plymouth (BA Maritime Studies) and King's College London (MA Defence Studies, 2012).

Naval career
Asquith joined the Royal Navy in September 1990, and went on to become commanding officer of the submarine  in 2008. After that he became commanding officer of the frigate  in September 2015, Assistant Director Higher Command and Staff Course in January 2016, and Deputy Commander of UK Maritime Component Command in the Middle East in May 2017. He then became Chief of Staff, Standing Joint Force in April 2018 and, after being promoted to rear admiral on 14 October 2019, he became Commander Operations in November 2019.

Asquith was appointed an Officer of the Order of the British Empire in the 2012 New Year Honours, and a Companion of the Order of the Bath in the 2022 Birthday Honours.

References

1972 births
Alumni of King's College London
Alumni of the University of Plymouth
Companions of the Order of the Bath
Living people
Officers of the Order of the British Empire
Royal Navy rear admirals